Juntos Hacemos Historia is a Mexican electoral alliance formed by the National Regeneration Movement (MORENA), the Labor Party (PT) and the Ecologist Green Party of Mexico (PVEM) to compete in the 2021 legislative election.

The coalition is the political heir of the Juntos Haremos Historia (Together we will make history) coalition, who competed the 2018 general election, with the difference that it no longer includes the Social Encounter Party (which was dissolved soon after the election) and now comprises PVEM (which was part of the Todos por México coalition in 2018 and joined the government only in 2019).

It  competed with the Va por México coalition (formed by the National Action Party, the Institutional Revolutionary Party and the Party of the Democratic Revolution)

The New Alliance Party is part of the alliance in certain states.

State elections 
The coalition is also competing in the 2021 state elections, in which the governors of 15 states will be elected. In each state, the coalition is made up of different parties, incorporating in some cases the Solidarity Encounter Party (PES) and the New Alliance Party (PNA), which are still active on the local level.

References 

Political party alliances in Mexico
Political parties established in 2020
2020 establishments in Mexico